Mary Platt Parmele (July 14, 1843 - May 26, 1911) was an American historian and writer.

Biography

Parmele was born in Albany, New York and educated in New York.  She was the daughter of Zephaniah Platt, the Michigan Attorney General, and the granddaughter of U.S. Representative Jonas Platt.  Her first marriage was to J. J. Agnew and her second marriage to Theodore W. Parmele. From 1892 she began contributing philosophical articles and short stories to reviews and magazines. Her most successful books were a number of "Short History" books of various countries written in the late 19th and early 20th century.  Her "Short History of ..." books included France, Russia, England, United States, Germany, Spain, and Italy.

Her style is a flowing narrative that ties together the various historical events of a country in easy to read, comprehensive text, tempered as it were by prevailing social views.

Contemporary review of Parmele's work (1893):

In too many of the little school histories there is but a tedious, bare narrative of apparently unconnected facts, and there is a profitless rigmarole of dates and names:  but when the sequence of cause and effect is not obscured, and form and life are given to the actors, and the development of events and institutions is traced, the story of the United States becomes, as it should become, the most, fascinating as it is the most important of histories to Americans; and whatever in historical inquiry and writing promotes accuracy, adds detail, and clears up obscurity, increases the worth and the, charm of the work.
'W.B. Harison has published in his "Evolution of Empire" series, a brief historical sketch of the United States, by Mary Platt Parmele, whose other volumes in the series have received cordial praise.  In this book one finds the story of our country told in about 300 pages, and very interestingly is it written.  The book leaves out the innumerable incidents and figures which are of great importance to students, but which are not necessary in a book for general reading, and presents the narrative in a graphic manner, in which the interest of the reader never flags.  The book is bound in blue buckram and costs but 75 cents. The other volumes in the series deal with the histories of France, England, and Germany, in the same brilliant vein.

Religion

Parmele was a Christian and was critical of the claims of Christian Science. In 1904, she published a book that argued against the claims of Christian Science.

Publications

The Evolution of an Empire: A Brief Historical Sketch of France (1894)
A Short History of England (1898)
A Short History of France (1898)
A Short History of Germany (1898)
A Short History of Spain (1898)
A Short History of the United States (1898)
The Kingdom of the Invisible (1902)
Christian Science: Is it Christian? Is it Scientific? (1904)
A Short History of England, Ireland, and Scotland (1907)
A Short History of Rome and Italy (1907)
A Short History of Russia (1907)

References

Who's Who in America (1908-9)

External links
 
 
 
 Her death notice

1843 births
1911 deaths
American Christians
American women historians
Critics of Christian Science
Writers from Albany, New York
Historians from New York (state)